Digital Paradise Incorporated is the operator of the largest and fastest growing Internet café chain in the Philippines, called Netopia Internet Café. Digital Paradise also operates the shared access facility Extreme Gaming Grounds and the Philippines franchise for Highlands Coffee.

History
The original Netopia Internet Café was founded by 2 computer techies, Axel Kornerup and James Guiab in 1996. It began as a private gaming room where friends could pit their eye hand coordination skills against each other. When the original Katipunan branch opened its doors to the public in January 1997, long queues formed, and soon a loyal customer base grew. By sheer word of mouth, Netopia effortlessly attracted a new wave of faithful clients.

Eventually, Netopia Computer Technology (as the company was known then) grew and was bought by ePLDT . Now renamed Digital Paradise Incorporated, the company began a long period of expansion that saw the Netopia brand become the largest Internet café in the Philippines and also the first to open branches in other countries in South East Asia .

On June 16, 2006 company president Raymond H. Ricafort stepped down and was replaced by George Tan of ePLDT.

Products and services
Digital Paradise offers what it calls shared access – the company has built an array of products and services around its primary computer rental business to take advantage of the relatively low penetration of personal computers into the Philippine market. As of 2005, the company has opened a new brand, Extreme Gaming Grounds, offering high end gaming and digital entertainment services as well as adding advanced desktop publishing and photo printing to its flagship Netopia Internet Cafe brand.

Current Brands
Netopia Internet Café – Was the largest and fastest growing Internet café chain in the Philippines. In 2006 Netopia was also recognized as the "Most Outstanding Filipino Franchise" at the 2006 Philippine Franchise Awards held by the Philippine Department of Trade and Industry. The brand is also known for their Mobile Internet Cafés, modified truck trailers that can be quickly transported to areas where they can be of most use. There were more than 180 Netopia Internet Café branches around the country.
Extreme Gaming Grounds – The first of its kind in South East Asia, Extreme Gaming Grounds (EGG for short) is an all in one digital entertainment center combining an internet café/game center, home theatre and lounge all into one facility.
Highlands Coffee – DPI operates Highlands Coffee shops in the Philippines under franchise from Viet Thai International.

Defunct Brands
Internetan – A budget Internet Café brand.

References
 Digital Paradise

PLDT subsidiaries
Communications in the Philippines
Information technology companies of the Philippines
Internet cafés
Companies based in Pasig

ilo:PLDT